The Dimples Interchange is a dual carriage road system flyover in Accra in the Greater Accra Region of Ghana. It is part of the six-lane,  George Walker Bush Highway built under the Millennium Challenge Account.

References

Road interchanges in Ghana
Roads in Ghana